Dalit Film and Cultural festival (DALIFF) is an international Film festival dedicated to Dalit-Bahujan cinema. This festival gives platform to content from dalit issues victimised by caste discrimination and often ignored by mainstream. First Dalit Film and Cultural festival was held in New York City in February 2019. Various films by Ambedkarite Dalit artists were screened.The Hollywood Reporter stated that ''the first Dalit Film Festival victoriously unspooled in New York."

See also
Dalit literature
Dalit studies
Pa. Ranjith
Dalit
Bodhisattava International Film Festival

References

External links
Official website

Dalit culture
Short film festivals in India
Ambedkarite organisations
Film festivals established in 2019